Alpine Freefalls is a water slide complex manufactured by ProSlide, currently operating since June 2, 2012, at Six Flags Great Escape and Hurricane Harbor in Queensbury, New York. The complex features 2 slides, Twisted Racer (a KrakenRacer) and Cliffhanger (a speed slide).

History
On August 22, 2011, Six Flags Great Escape Lodge & White Water Bay announce on their Facebook page that there is going to be a big surprise for their loyal fans of the lodge on Thursday September 1, 2011. Then on the first of September 2011, the Great Escape announced Alpine Freefalls for the 2012 season. Alpine Freefalls opened to the public on June 2, 2012, a couple weeks after Splashwater Kingdom (which would later be renamed to Hurricane Harbor in 2019) opened for the season.

Ride

Alpine Freefalls is a Nordic-themed attraction, that features two rides on one complex structure.

Cliffhanger
Cliffhanger is the park's first free-fall speed slide with Skybox technology. The ride is on the tallest part of the structure  at six stories tall. Once you entered the skybox, the floor will drop below you and you will free fall  down the slide on an 80 degree drop into six inches of water. Riders must be 48" tall.

Twisted Racer
Twisted Racer is the Northeast's first of its kind mat racer. The ride will be four stories tall on the structure, and it features four lanes with fully enclosed tunnels. You will speed head-first on mats through pretzel-shaped tubes before opening up into a final drop and a straight shot to the finish line at speeds of over 25 feet per second. Riders must be 42" tall.

See also
 2012 in amusement parks

References

External links

 

The Great Escape and Hurricane Harbor
Six Flags attractions
Amusement rides introduced in 2012
Water rides